Anthony John Kreft (born 27 March 1945) is a former New Zealand rugby union player. A prop, Kreft represented  at a provincial level, and was a member of the New Zealand national side, the All Blacks, on their 1968 tour of Australia. He played four matches for the All Blacks on that tour, including one international.

References

1945 births
Living people
People from Milton, New Zealand
People educated at Maniototo Area School
New Zealand rugby union players
New Zealand international rugby union players
Otago rugby union players
Rugby union props
Rugby union players from Otago